Allophanes is a genus of beetles in the family Carabidae, containing the following species:

 Allophanes auripennis (Chaudoir, 1877)
 Allophanes drescheri Louwerens, 1952
 Allophanes limbipennis (Chaudoir, 1877)
 Allophanes mundus (Andrewes, 1931)

References

Lebiinae